Rameez Junaid and Andreas Siljeström were the defending champions but only Junaid chose to defend his title, partnering Tim Pütz, but withdrew before the tournament began.

Andre Begemann and Frederik Nielsen won the title after defeating David O'Hare and Joe Salisbury 6–3, 6–4 in the final.

Seeds

Draw

References
 Main Draw

Open Harmonie mutuelle - Doubles
2017 Doubles